Japan–Lithuania relations are the bilateral foreign relations between Japan and Lithuania. Japan has an embassy in Vilnius. Lithuania has an embassy in Tokyo. Japan was one of the few countries to recognize the Soviet occupation of the Baltic countries including Lithuania.

On February, 1992, Embassy of Japan to Lithuania was established in Denmark, and on January, 1997, it moved to Vilnius, Lithuania. On June, 1998, Embassy of Lithuania to Japan was established in Tokyo.

History

Interwar period 
January 3, 1919, the date when Japan recognized Lithuania de facto is considered the beginning of the bilateral relations. On February 8, 1929, the agreement by which visas were abolished was signed between Japan and Lithuania, while in 1930 the Trade and shipping agreement was signed.

During the period of the Molotov–Ribbentrop Pact 
On November 23, 1939, the Japanese consulate was established, led by Vice Consul Chiune Sugihara. However, due to the occupation, the consulate was shut the following year. In 1940, Chiune Sugihara assisted the flight of Jewish refugees from the imminent Nazi invasion of Lithuania by issuing them transit visas from the consulate in Kaunas, despite instructions from the Japanese Government attempting to block his actions. Up to 10,000 refugees were saved with this action.

Modern relations 
There is a significant close partnership between the city of Kuji and Klaipėda, established in 1989.

Japan de facto re-recognized Lithuania on September 6, 1991, and a month later diplomatic relations were re-established between these countries. In 1997 the Embassy of Japan was established in Vilnius and in 1998 the Embassy of Lithuania was established in Tokyo.

In March 2016, Japan and Lithuania agreed to cooperate on nuclear safety.

Military ties 
In August 2016, Training Squadron vessels of the Japan Maritime Self-Defense Force Kashima, Asagiri and Setoyuki sailed into Klaipėda port, to celebrate 25th anniversary of the re-establishment of diplomatic relations between this sovereign republic in the Baltic region and the maritime nation in the Far East. Minister of Foreign Affairs of Lithuania Linas Antanas Linkevičius welcomed the Japanese vessels and their steadfast partnership based on the same fundamental values since 1991 as well as referred an honorable and righteous diplomat Chiune Sugihara, who served as the Japanese Vice-Consul at Kaunas from 1939 to 1940 and granted visas to thousands of Jewish and other minority refugees in his short term of office. The JMSDF Training Squadron also visited Lithuanian Military Academy, where some students and officers train Kendo, a modern Japanese martial arts descended from Bushido and swordsmanship. On August 10, a sports exchange event between Japanese and Lithuanian officers was held at the military academy, and the Lithuanian team won the Kendo match to Japanese team.

High level visits 
In April 2001, Lithuanian President Valdas Adamkus paid an official visit to Japan, and on April 11, he held talks with Japanese Prime Minister Yoshiro Mori about their views on several issues that includes their bilateral relations, Japan–Russia relations and Lithuania's accession to EU and NATO.

In May 2007, the Emperor and Empress of Japan, Akihito and Michiko, made an official visit to Lithuania.

See also

 Foreign relations of Japan
 Foreign relations of Lithuania

References

External links
  Embassy of Lithuania in Japan
 Embassy of Japan in Lithuania
 Lithuanian Shotokan Karate Federation
Lithuanian Kendo Association
 Lithuanian Judo Federation 
  

 
Lithuania
Bilateral relations of Lithuania